These are the official results of the women's 200 metres event at the 1996 Summer Olympics in Atlanta, Georgia. There were a total number of 47 participating athletes, with two rounds (six heats in round 1, four heats in round 2), two semifinals and a final.

Records
These were the standing world and Olympic records (in seconds) prior to the 1996 Summer Olympics.

Results

Heats

Top four in each heat and next eight fastest advanced to the quarterfinals.

Heat one

Heat two

Heat three

Heat four

Heat five

Heat six

Quarterfinals

Top four in each heat advanced to the semifinals.

Heat one

Heat two

Heat three

Heat four

Semifinals
Top four from each heat advanced to the finals.

Heat one

Heat two

Final

Wind in the finals = 0.3 m/sNotes: DNS = did not start

References

Athletics at the 1996 Summer Olympics
200 metres at the Olympics
1996 in women's athletics
Women's events at the 1996 Summer Olympics